Philippe Moggio is a French-Colombian former professional tennis player, banker, sports executive and current General Secretary of CONCACAF.

Moggio was appointed to the position in May 2016.

He represented Colombia at the 1996, 1997, 1998 and 1999 Davis Cup.

References

External links

1973 births
Colombian people of French descent
Living people
Colombian male tennis players